Consciousness is the fourth full-length album by American post-grunge band Smile Empty Soul. It was released on August 25, 2009. "Don't Ever Leave" was chosen as the album's first single. A music video for "Don't Ever Leave" featured actor Sean Faris.  "We're Through" also included a live music video for the song.

Track listing 
All songs by Smile Empty Soul.

Personnel
 Sean Danielsen – lead vocals, lead & rhythm guitars
 Ryan Martin – bass guitar
 Jake Kilmer – drums, backing vocals

References

External links
 MySpace

2009 albums
Smile Empty Soul albums
Albums produced by Eddie Wohl